Hodge theorem may refer to:

Hodge theory
Hodge index theorem